Francesco Vimercato (1512–1571) was an Italian Aristotelian scholar. He was a Royal Reader in Philosophy in Paris. He is known for his commentaries on Aristotle’s ethical and zoological works.

In 1561 he left France to work for Emmanuel Philibert, Duke of Savoy. He was employed as a professor, and then a diplomat.

References
 Neal W. Gilbert, Francesco Vimercato of Milan: A Bio-Bibliography, Studies in the Renaissance, Vol. 12, 1965 (1965), pp. 188–217

Notes

1512 births
1571 deaths
Italian philosophers